Dashitounan railway station is a railway station in Dashitou, Dunhua, Yanbian, Jilin, China on the Jilin–Hunchun intercity railway. Although the line opened in 2015, Dashitou South railway station did not open until 10 April 2018.

See also
Dashitou railway station

References 

Railway stations in Yanbian
Railway stations in China opened in 2018